Beeston St Andrew is a civil parish north of Norwich in the Broadland district of Norfolk, England.  It contains Beeston Park and according to the 2001 census had a population of 39. At the 2011 Census the population remained less than 100 and was included in the civil parish of Spixworth.

It is part of the ecclesiastical parish of Sprowston with Beeston St Andrew.

Broadland
Villages in Norfolk
Civil parishes in Norfolk